John McLoughlin (born ) is one of two Port Authority of New York and New Jersey police officers who survived after being trapped under the rubble of the World Trade Center during the September 11 attacks. His rescue and that of William Jimeno are later the subject of Oliver Stone's film World Trade Center in 2006, in which McLoughlin was portrayed by actor Nicolas Cage.

McLoughlin graduated from the State University of New York at Oswego, where he was a member of the Sigma Tau Chi fraternity.

September 11, 2001
McLoughlin led a team of officers, including Jimeno, who were on the main concourse between the two towers when the South Tower collapsed. The five ran toward a nearby freight elevator, and were buried in the ensuing collapse of the concourse. Officers Antonio Rodrigues and Chris Amoroso were killed immediately. McLoughlin, Jimeno and a third officer, Dominick Pezzulo, were trapped but alive. The freight elevator withstood the devastation, creating breathing room that saved their lives. Pezzulo, who was the only one not pinned, immediately managed to free himself and tried to free Jimeno, but the subsequent collapse of the North Tower caused shifting and additional debris falling through. Pezzulo was mortally wounded and died minutes after the collapse. McLoughlin and Jimeno were rescued  after former U.S. Marine Corps sergeant Jason Thomas and staff sergeant Dave Karnes heard their cries for help about ten hours after they were first buried.

The two men were eventually rescued after hours of painstaking work — Jimeno after 13 hours and McLoughlin after 22 hours. McLoughlin was gravely injured. Doctors kept him in an induced coma for six weeks. He underwent 27 surgeries and spent nearly three months in the hospital and rehabilitation. Four months after their rescue, McLoughlin and Jimeno — who both have since retired — took part in a ceremony at Ground Zero to watch as the final column was removed. When all the uniformed officers walked out of The Pit, the two were last to leave. Only 20 people were pulled out of the rubble alive; Jimeno and McLoughlin were numbers 18 and 19. On June 11, 2002, McLoughlin (with a walker) and Jimeno (with a limp) walked across a stage at Madison Square Garden to receive the Port Authority's Medal of Honor.

The film World Trade Center (2006) tells the story of McLoughlin (played by Nicolas Cage) and William Jimeno (portrayed by Michael Peña). The two make a small appearance at the BBQ greeting them.

See also
 Ronald Paul Bucca

References

External links
 Article in Court TV Crime Library
 
 Slate magazine article on truth vs. fiction in Oliver Stone's World Trade Center 
 Article on rescuer Dave Karnes
 Times Herald Record article WTC Hero's Homecoming

1950s births
American police officers
Living people
People from New York City
Port Authority of New York and New Jersey Police Department
State University of New York at Oswego alumni
Survivors of the September 11 attacks